Scrobipalpa deluccae is a moth in the family Gelechiidae. It was described by Povolný in 1966. The moth is found in Lebanon and Syria. Records from Malta are based on misidentifications.

The forewings are light brownish, densely sprinkled with blackish scales. The hindwings are dirty whitish to grey.

References

Scrobipalpa
Moths described in 1966